The ten Attic orators were considered the greatest orators and logographers of the classical era (5th–4th century BC). They are included in the "Canon of Ten", which probably originated in Alexandria. A.E. Douglas has argued, however, that it was not until the second century AD that the canon took on the form that is recognised today.

Alexandrian "Canon of Ten"
 Aeschines
 Andocides
 Antiphon
 Demosthenes
 Dinarchus
 Hypereides
 Isaeus
 Isocrates
 Lycurgus
 Lysias

As far as Homer (8th or 9th century BC), the art of effective speaking was of considerable value in Greece. In Homer's epic, the Iliad, the warrior, Achilles, was described as "a speaker of words and a doer of deeds".

Until the 5th century BC, however, oratory was not formally taught. In fact, it is not until the middle of that century that the Sicilian orator, Corax, along with his pupil, Tisias, began a formal study of rhetoric. In 427 BC, another Sicilian named Gorgias of Leontini visited Athens and gave a speech which apparently dazzled the citizens. Gorgias’s "intellectual" approach to oratory, which included new ideas, forms of expression, and methods of argument, was continued by Isocrates, a 4th-century BC educator and rhetorician. Oratory eventually became a central subject of study in the formalized Greek education system.

The work of the Attic orators inspired the later rhetorical movement of Atticism, an approach to speech composition in a simple rather than ornate style.

Notes

References
Carawan, Edwin (ed.): Oxford readings in the Attic orators. Oxford; New York: Oxford University Press, 2007. 
Smith, R.M. "A New Look at the Canon of the Ten Attic Orators", Mnemosyne 48.1 (1995): 66-79.

External links
Lives of the Ten Orators, translated by H.N. Fowler